Shoot Out the Lights is the sixth and final album by British husband-and-wife rock duo Richard and Linda Thompson. It was produced by Joe Boyd and released in 1982 on his Hannibal label. A critically acclaimed work, AllMusic's Mark Deming noted that Shoot Out the Lights has "often been cited as Richard Thompson's greatest work, and it's difficult for anyone who has heard his body of work to argue the point."

History
After their 1979 album Sunnyvista had sold poorly, Richard and Linda Thompson found themselves without a record deal. In the spring of 1980 they toured as the support act for Gerry Rafferty and in June of that year they recorded some demo tracks at Woodworm Studios in Oxfordshire.

Later that same year and with the Thompsons still without a contract, Rafferty stepped in and offered to finance and produce a new Richard and Linda Thompson album and then use his contacts in the industry and the finished album to secure a new contract with the Thompsons. This album was recorded during September and October 1980 at Chipping Norton Recording Studios in Oxfordshire.

As the project proceeded there was increasing tension between Richard Thompson and Rafferty. Thompson preferred a spontaneous approach to recording and found Rafferty's time-consuming and perfectionist approach hard to cope with. He also felt increasingly frozen out of the project: "When he got to the mixing, I just didn’t bother to turn up . . . because if I said something it was totally ignored and I thought 'hey, whose record is this anyway?'"

Nevertheless, the album was completed, but Rafferty could not interest any record companies and lost in the region of £30,000 on the project. Copies of the tapes of the Rafferty-sponsored sessions have subsequently become available as a bootleg under the titles Rafferty's Folly and Before Joe Could Pull the Trigger.

Finally, in the summer of 1981 Joe Boyd signed the Thompsons to his small Hannibal label and, in November of that year, the Thompsons went into Olympic Studios in London and recorded a new album. Boyd's proposal, which the Thompsons accepted, was that the album be recorded in a matter of days so that money could be put aside for a tour of the US. The resulting Shoot Out the Lights included fresh recordings of six songs that had been recorded during the Rafferty-sponsored sessions and two newer songs. Linda Thompson was several months pregnant when the album was recorded and so there was no prospect of an immediate release or supporting tour. By the time the album was released Richard and Linda Thompson's marriage was over.

Ironically, the album that was recorded when the Thompsons' career seemed all but over and which turned out to be their last album together was their best-selling album and was acclaimed as one of their greatest artistic achievements. Shoot Out the Lights and the May 1982 tour were crucial in re-launching Richard Thompson's career and in restoring his reputation as a songwriter and guitar player.

Critical response

For a release on an independent label, Shoot Out the Lights had a significant critical impact. Robert Christgau made it a pick hit saying "these are powerfully double-edged metaphors for the marriage struggle". At the end of 1982, many critics placed the album on their year-end "best of" lists, for example, placing it at #2 on The Village Voice Pazz & Jop Critics Poll. It has continued to be highly regarded. AllMusic praises it as "a meditation on love and loss in which beauty, passion, and heady joy can still be found in defeat". And The Rolling Stone Album Guide called the album "absolutely perfect" and cited it for its "vividly emotional writing and the stirringly impassioned playing".

In 1987, Shoot Out the Lights was ranked #24 on Rolling Stone magazine's "100 Best Albums of the Last 20 Years" and in 1989 it was ranked #9 on the same magazine's list of The 100 Best Albums of the Eighties.  The album was ranked number 332 on its list of the 500 greatest albums of all time. It was voted number 422 in the third edition of Colin Larkin's All Time Top 1000 Albums (2000). In March 2005, Q magazine placed the title song at number 99 in its list of the 100 Greatest Guitar Tracks.

Release history 
In 1990 Hannibal released Shoot Out the Lights on CD with the B-side "Living in Luxury" as a bonus track on the first run. This song is not included on any subsequent editions of the album. In 1993 Rykodisc released it as part of their AU20 Mastering Gold CD series, with Dr. Toby Mountain of Northeastern Digital Recording, Inc., in Southborough, Massachusetts using Sony's proprietary Super Bit Mapping (SBM) mastering process to reduce the digital master from 20-bit to 16-bit required for the Red Book compact disc standard. Mountain again remastered the album in 2004 for release on Super Audio CD (SACD) on Rykodisc. In 2005 the album was reissued on 180 gram vinyl by the 4 Men With Beards label. In October 2010 Rhino Handmade issued a deluxe 2CD edition of the album with 11 live bonus tracks and a 40-page booklet.

Track listing
All songs written by Richard Thompson except as noted.

Side one
"Don't Renege on Our Love" – 4:19
"Walking on a Wire" – 5:29
"Man in Need" – 3:36
"Just the Motion" – 6:19

Side two
"Shoot Out the Lights" – 5:24
"Back Street Slide" – 4:33
"Did She Jump or Was She Pushed?" (Richard Thompson, Linda Thompson) – 4:52
 "Wall of Death" – 3:43

"Living in Luxury" (2:32) was a B-side included as a bonus track on early CDs of the album, though removed from later editions.

2010 "De luxe" edition 
A two-disc "de luxe" edition of this album was issued by Rhino Handmade Records in October 2010. The first disc had the eight tracks of the original album. The second disc comprised live tracks recorded during the 1982 tour of the US.

The tracks on the second disc are:
"Dargai" (J. Scott Skinner, arranged by Richard Thompson)
"Back Street Slide"
"Pavanne" (Richard Thompson, Linda Thompson)
"I'll Keep It with Mine" (Bob Dylan)
"Borrowed Time"
"Did She Jump or Was She Pushed?" (Richard Thompson, Linda Thompson)
"I'm a Dreamer" (Sandy Denny)
"Honky Tonk Blues" (Hank Williams)
"Shoot Out the Lights"
"For Shame of Doing Wrong"
"Dimming of the Day"
"The Price of Love" (Don Everly, Phil Everly) (bonus track)

(all tracks composed by Richard Thompson except where noted otherwise)

Personnel
The same core band appeared on the original album and on the 2010 live disc, except for Dave Pegg who is on the album only.

Richard Thompson – vocals, lead guitar, accordion, hammered dulcimer
Linda Thompson – vocals
Simon Nicol – rhythm guitar
Dave Pegg – bass (3,6,7,8)
Pete Zorn – bass (1,2,4,5 and all of the 2010 deluxe edition live disc), backing vocals
David Mattacks – drums
Additional personnel
The Watersons (Norma, Mike, Lal and Martin Carthy) – backing vocals
Clive Gregson – backing vocals
Stephen Corbett – cornet
Brian Jones – cornet
Phil Goodwin – tuba
Stephen Barnett – trombone
Mark Cutts – trombone
Technical
Bill Gill - engineer
Gered Mankowitz - cover photography

References

External links
 

1982 albums
Richard and Linda Thompson albums
Albums produced by Joe Boyd
Hannibal Records albums
Albums recorded at Olympic Sound Studios